Walking Troubles of Organic Hemiplegy (1898) is the first documentary film in the world, created by Romanian neurologist Gheorghe Marinescu. The film depicts several patients walking in four directions against a black background before and after treatment.

Marinescu came to the idea of making the film after having used chronophotography under the influence of Étienne-Jules Marey. Marinescu praised the use of the cinematographic techniques in the scientific investigation.

Other documentary films
 A Case of Hysterical Hemiplegia Cured Through Hypnotic Suggestion (1899)
 Walking Difficulties Due to Progressive Locomotary Ataxia (1900)
 Pseudo-Hypertrophic or Myosclerotic Paralysis Among Myopathies (1901)

References

External links
 
 Walking Troubles of Organic Hemiplegy on Dailymotion
 Dr Gh. Marinescu on Victorian Cinema

1898 films
Documentary films about health care
Documentary films about science
Romanian documentary films
Romanian silent films
Romanian black-and-white films
1890s documentary films